Christoph Höhne (born 12 February 1941 in Borsdorf, Saxony) is a racewalker of the SV Dynamo. He competed at 50 km for East Germany in the 1960s and 1970s. He was trained by Max Weber.

Höhne won a gold medal at the 1968 Summer Olympics at Mexico City and participated in the Olympics in 1964 and 1972. His Olympic victory made history as his margin of victory was over ten minutes. He participated in an episode of the cold war in sports at the 1972 Summer Olympics in Munich: On the evening before the race, East German officials received an anonymous tip that he wanted to defect during the 50 km race. They did not believe the allegations, but Höhne went to the start line unnerved and finished in fourteenth place.

Höhne won twice at the European Championships (in 1969 and 1974). He won the IAAF World Race Walking Cup at 50 km in 1965, 1967 and, 1970 and came in third in 1973.

After his sports career, he studied photography and became a well known sports photographer  in East Germany. Among other things, he received a gold medal at the International Sports Photography Exhibition in Reus, Spain in 1978. After the unification of Germany, he has done freelance photography for the daily newspapers Junge Welt and Sportecho.

Note:
His place of birth is reported as Machern profile 
or as Borsdorf   both in Saxony

References

External links 
 

1941 births
Living people
People from Leipzig (district)
East German male racewalkers
Sportspeople from Saxony
Photographers from Saxony
Olympic athletes of the United Team of Germany
Olympic athletes of East Germany
Athletes (track and field) at the 1964 Summer Olympics
Athletes (track and field) at the 1968 Summer Olympics
Athletes (track and field) at the 1972 Summer Olympics
Olympic gold medalists for East Germany
European Athletics Championships medalists
Medalists at the 1968 Summer Olympics
Olympic gold medalists in athletics (track and field)
Recipients of the Patriotic Order of Merit in silver
World Athletics Race Walking Team Championships winners